The 2003–04 Maltese Second Division (also known as MIA Second Division 2003–04 due to sponsorship reasons) started on 27 September 2003 and ended on 3 May 2004.

Participating teams
 Attard
 Dingli Swallows
 Gozo FC
 Gzira United
 Mellieha
 St. Andrews
 St. Georges
 Vittoriosa Stars
 Xghajra Tornadoes
 Zebbug Rangers
 Zejtun Corinthians
 Zurrieq

Changes from previous season
 Tarxien Rainbows and San Gwann were promoted to the 2003–04 Maltese First Division. They were replaced with Gozo FC and Xghajra Tornadoes, both relegated from 2002–03 Maltese First Division.
 Qormi and Luqa St. Andrews were relegated to the Maltese Third Division. They were replaced with Zejtun Corinthians and St. Georges, both promoted from the Third Division.

Final standings

Promotion play-off

|}

Gozo promoted to Maltese First Division.

Relegation playoffs

|+ Promotion decider

|}

Top scorers

External links
 Complete set of results  at maltafootball.com

Maltese Second Division seasons
Malta
3